João Paulo di Fabio (born 10 February 1979 in São Carlos), known as Di Fábio, is an Italian-Brazilian football defender who plays for América Futebol Clube (SP).

He started his professional career at Atlético Paranaense and formerly played for Cagliari Calcio, Como Calcio in Italy, FC Thun in Switzerland, Busan I'Park in South Korea and Portimonense S.C. in Portugal.

He also holds Italian passport.

References

Brazilian FA Database

External links

1979 births
Living people
People from São Carlos
Brazilian footballers
Brazilian expatriate footballers
Club Athletico Paranaense players
Cagliari Calcio players
Como 1907 players
FC Thun players
Portimonense S.C. players
Agremiação Sportiva Arapiraquense players
América Futebol Clube (SP) players
Swiss Super League players
K League 1 players
Busan IPark players
Serie B players
Primeira Liga players
Expatriate footballers in South Korea
Expatriate footballers in Italy
Expatriate footballers in Portugal
Brazilian expatriate sportspeople in South Korea
Expatriate footballers in Switzerland
Brazilian expatriate sportspeople in Italy
Brazilian people of Italian descent
Brazilian expatriate sportspeople in Switzerland
Association football defenders
Footballers from São Paulo (state)